Hua Wiang is a tambon (subdistrict) of Mueang Lampang District, in Lampang Province, Thailand. In 2020 it had a total population of 6,942 people.

Administration

Central administration
The tambon has no administrative villages (muban).

Local administration
The whole area of the subdistrict is covered by the city (Thesaban Nakhon) Lampang (เทศบาลนครลำปาง).

References

External links
Thaitambon.com on Hua Wiang

Tambon of Lampang province
Populated places in Lampang province